Kåre Minde (born 1930–31, died 6 April 2003) was a Norwegian politician for the Conservative Party. He sat for 16 years in Askøy Municipal Council, and was Mayor of Askøy from 1980 to 1983.

References

Mayors of Askøy
People from Askøy
Conservative Party (Norway) politicians
2003 deaths
1930 births